Krissel Joy Valdez (born October 10, 1990) is a Filipina–Davaoena singer and the first runner-up of Star Power: Sharon Search For the Next Female Superstar. Better known as Krissel Valdez and dubbed as "The Soulful Diva of Davao".

Early life
Krissel was a member of D-Base Band, a local band in Davao.

Krissel Won the Grand Prix of European Star Rain in Prague Czech Republic . She is the first Asian and Filipina who won Grandprix in European Performing arts competition.

Krissel joined WCOPA (Worlds Championship of Performing Arts) in Hollywood California and won Silver medal in Pop Category.

Krissel was also part of the Musical Rock of Ages Re-run.

Krissel was also the Leading Lady of the World Boxer Nonito "The Filipino Flash" Donaire in the Visayan Indie Film " Palad ta ang Nagbuot ( Our Fate Decides).

TV Appearances

References
 CRISPINA MARTINEZ-BELEN, "Getting to know the 'Star Power' Final 5", 
 

1990 births
Living people
Star Magic
People from Davao City
Singers from Davao del Sur
Participants in Philippine reality television series
21st-century Filipino singers
21st-century Filipino women singers